The Dubawi Stakes, is a horse race run over a distance of 1,200 metres (six furlongs) on dirt in January at Meydan Racecourse in Dubai. The race is named after the successful racehorse and breeding stallion Dubawi.

The Dubawi Stakes was first contested in 2014 as a Listed race and was elevated to Group 3 level in 2018. The first running was contested on a synthetic Tapeta surface but was switched to dirt a year later.

Records
Record time:
 1:10.66 - Reynaldothewizard 2017

Most successful horse (2 wins):
 3 - Reynaldothewizard 2015, 2016, 2017

Most wins by a jockey:
 4 - Richard Mullen 2015, 2016, 2017, 2019

Most wins by a trainer:
 4 - Satish Seemar 2015, 2016, 2017, 2019

Most wins by an owner:
 3 - Zabeel Racing International 2015, 2016, 2017

Winners

See also
 List of United Arab Emirates horse races

References

Horse races in the United Arab Emirates
Recurring events established in 2014
2014 establishments in the United Arab Emirates